Athletics competitions at the 1971 South Pacific Games were held at the Stade Pater Te Hono Nui in Pirae, French Polynesia, between September 9-15, 1971.

A total of 35 events were contested, 22 by men and 13 by women.

Medal summary
Medal winners and their results were published on the Athletics Weekly webpage
courtesy of Tony Isaacs and Børre Lilloe, and on the Oceania Athletics Association webpage by Bob Snow.

Complete results can also be found on the Oceania Athletics Association webpage.

Men

Women

Medal table (unofficial)

Participation (unofficial)
Athletes from 13 countries were reported to participate:

 
 British Solomon Islands
 Cook Islands
 
 
 
 
 

 Papua and New Guinea

References

External links
Pacific Games Council
Oceania Athletics Association

Athletics at the Pacific Games
Athletics competitions in French Polynesia
South Pacific Games
1971 in French Polynesia
1971 Pacific Games